Kottakkavu Mar Thoma Syro-Malabar Pilgrim Church is a Syro-Malabar church located in North Paravur. According to Saint Thomas Christian tradition, the church was established in 52 AD by St. Thomas (Mar Thoma shleeha), one of the twelve apostles of Jesus Christ. It is one of the first churches in India and is called an Apostolic Church credited to the Apostolate of St. Thomas who preached and also started conversion of people to Syriac Christianity here. It is one of the Ezharappallikal (seven Royal churches) that he established in India; the other six churches were established at Kodungalloor, Kokkamangalam, Palayoor, Kollam, Niranam, and Nilackal.

History

Mar Sabor and Mar Proth
Mar Sabor and Mar Proth came from Persia to Malankara in the 9th century. They built and presided over a number of churches in Malankara operating in accordance with Saint Thomas Christians. The second church of Kottakkavu was rebuilt at this time. After their death they were remembered as saints and their name was given to this church. Kottakkavu Sliva, a Persian cross engraved on granite stone by Mar Sabor and Mar Proth, is preserved in the chapel in front of the church.

MS Vatican Syriac N. iv., dated A.D. 1556, and has the following colophon in folio 278:
 "By the help of our Lord we have finished this book of the Prophets; it was written on a Monday, the 18th of February, in the year 1556 of the birth of our Lord. I, priest Jacob, the disciple of Mar Jacob, and from the village of Puraur, have written this book in the holy Church of Mar Shapur and Mar Iapot [Piruz]. May the holy name of God be praised for ever. Amen!"

Old church
The existing old church, the third church, was built in 1308. The ruined old church is again reconstructed in the 21st century.

Gallery

References

Bibliography
 

Syro-Malabar Catholic church buildings
Churches in Ernakulam district
North Paravur
Eastern Catholic churches in Kerala
Ēḻarappaḷḷikaḷ